The Maviha or Mbiha, are an ethnic and linguistic group based along the border between Mtwara Region of Tanzania and Mozambique. . They speak Mahiva language (sometimes considered a dialect of the more common Makonde language), a Niger-Congo language. As a second language, the people will often speak languages such as English in Tanzania, Portuguese and Makua in Mozambique, and Swahili in both countries.

Ethnic groups in Mozambique
Ethnic groups in Tanzania
Indigenous peoples of East Africa